Freeform is a digital whiteboarding application developed by Apple for macOS, iOS, and iPadOS devices, first revealed during the 2022 Worldwide Developers Conference, and officially launched on December 13, 2022, alongside iOS 16.2, iPadOS 16.2, and macOS 13.1. It allows users to create infinitely scaling canvases called "boards", which can display a range of inputs including text notes, photos, documents, and web links. There are also a variety of pen and brush tools available on the iOS and iPadOS versions of the software, letting users add sketches or handwriting to their boards similar to the tools available in the Notes app, which are compatible with the Apple Pencil.

The app is designed to encourage brainstorming and enable real-time collaboration between users, with support for FaceTime and iCloud syncing.

References

IOS software
MacOS text-related software
IOS-based software made by Apple Inc.
Collaborative software